Canadian federal elections have provided the following results in the Côte-Nord and Saguenay–Lac-Saint-Jean.

Regional Profile
This regions used to be traditionally Liberal, except for Roberval which has voted for the Social Credit Party. The Liberal dominance ended in 1984 as Brian Mulroney, who is from this area, was able to gather Quebec nationalist support and sweep the region in 1984 and 1988.

With the advent of the nationalist Bloc Québécois in 1993, nationalist support left the Tories, and this area became a traditional Bloc stronghold. This is true except for the Chicoutimi area which has voted federalist with André Harvey running as a Progressive Conservative and winning in 1997, and running as a Liberal and winning in 2000.

The Bloc swept the region in 2004, but the Conservatives picked up a seat here in 2006 and weakened the Bloc's grip on the remaining seats as Liberal support collapsed.

In 2011, another regional sweep gave four of the five seats to the New Democrats, shutting out the Bloc and leaving the Conservatives with one of their two seats. In the 2015 election, the NDP lost all but one of its seat in the region, while the Bloc managed a comeback in the Côte-Nord region, the Liberals won one seat in Chicoutimi and the Conservatives won one seat in the southwestern part of the region near Quebec City.

Votes by party throughout time

2019 - 43rd general election

2015 - 42nd general election

2011 - 41st General Election

2008 - 40th General Election

2006 - 39th General Election

2004 - 38th General Election

Maps 

Charlevoix-Montmorency
Chicoutimi-Le Fjord
Jonquière-Alma
Manicouagan
Roberval

2000 - 37th General Election

1997 - 36th General Election 

|-
| style="background-color:whitesmoke" |Beauport—Montmorency—Orléans
||
|Michel Guimond21,994
|
|Simone Gosselin13,863
|
|Yves Baribeau1,255
|
|Jessica Greenberg885
|
|Michel Cliche12,748
|
|Jean Bédard (M.-L.)419
||
|Michel Guimond
|-
| style="background-color:whitesmoke" |Charlevoix
||
|Gérard Asselin19,792
|
|Ghislain Maltais9,838
|
|
|
|François Dumoutier454
|
|Nicole Massicotte6,443
|
|
||
|Gérard Asselin
|-
| style="background-color:whitesmoke" |Chicoutimi
|
|Gilbert Fillion18,281
|
|Eric Delisle4,839
|
|
|
|Anne-Marie Buck853
||
|André Harvey18,598
|
|
||
|Gilbert Fillion
|-
| style="background-color:whitesmoke" |Jonquière
||
|Jocelyne Girard-Bujold16,415
|
|Martial Guay4,874
|
|
|
|Carmel Bélanger353
|
|Daniel Giguère11,808
|
|Normand Dufour (NL)348
||
|André Caron
|-
| style="background-color:whitesmoke" |Lac-Saint-Jean
||
|Stéphan Tremblay21,506
|
|Clément Lajoie7,109
|
|
|
|Jean-François Morval391
|
|Sabin Simard4,845
|
|
||
|Stéphan Tremblay
|-
| style="background-color:whitesmoke" |Manicouagan
||
|Ghislain Fournier12,203
|
|André Maltais10,671
|
|
|
|Pierre Ducasse1,041
|
|Michel Allard2,009
|
|
||
|Bernard St-Laurent
|-
| style="background-color:whitesmoke" |Roberval
||
|Michel Gauthier16,207
|
|Jean-Pierre Boivin8,176
|
|
|
|Alain Giguère412
|
|France Tanguay6,312
|
|
||
|Michel Gauthier
|}

1993 - 35th General Election 

|-
| style="background-color:whitesmoke" |Beauport—Montmorency—Orléans
||
|Michel Guimond31,671
|
|Doris Dawson-Bernard7,899
|
|Charles Deblois12,687
|
|Suzanne Fortin1,174
|
|Gilles Rochette1,138
|
|Micheline Loignon294
||
|Charles DebloisMontmorency—Orléans
|-
| style="background-color:whitesmoke" |Charlevoix
||
|Gérard Asselin23,615
|
|André Desgagnés7,140
|
|Gérard Guy6,781
|
|Audrey Carpentier552
|
|
|
|
||
|Brian Mulroney
|-
| style="background-color:whitesmoke" |Chicoutimi
||
|Gilbert Fillion29,392
|
|Georges Frenette4,958
|
|André Harvey11,038
|
|Christine Moore541
|
|
|
|
||
|André Harvey
|-
| style="background-color:whitesmoke" |Jonquière
||
|André Caron25,061
|
|Gilles Savard4,519
|
|Jean-Pierre Blackburn6,637
|
|Karl Bélanger410
|
|Normand Dufour435
|
|
||
|Jean-Pierre Blackburn
|-
| style="background-color:whitesmoke" |Lac-Saint-Jean
||
|Lucien Bouchard27,209
|
|Noël Girard5,263
|
|Denise Falardeau3,115
|
|Marie D. Jalbert444
|
|
|
|
||
|Lucien Bouchard
|-
| style="background-color:whitesmoke" |Manicouagan
||
|Bernard St-Laurent14,859
|
|Rita Lavoie5,694
|
|Charles Langlois6,024
|
|Eric Hébert451
|
|
|
|
||
|Charles Langlois
|-
| style="background-color:whitesmoke" |Roberval
||
|Michel Gauthier18,869
|
|Aurélien Gill6,443
|
|Henri-Paul Brassard5,793
|
|Alain Giguère485
|
|
|
|
||
|Benoît Bouchard
|}
2. Lucien Bouchard was elected as a Progressive-Conservative in 1988 election but left the PC caucus in 1990 to seat as independent and then Bloc Québécois MP from 1991 onwards.

1988 - 34th General Election 

|-
| style="background-color:whitesmoke" |Charlevoix
||
|Brian Mulroney33,730
|
|Martin Cauchon5,994
|
|Kenneth Choquette1,819
|
|François Yo Gourd (Rhino) 600
||
|Charles-André Hamelin
|-
| style="background-color:whitesmoke" |Chicoutimi
||
|André Harvey30,699
|
|Laval Gauthier8,047
|
|Mustapha Elayoubi4,870
|
|
||
|André Harvey
|-
| style="background-color:whitesmoke" |Jonquière
||
|Jean-Pierre Blackburn21,523
|
|Françoise Gauthier7,026
|
|Laval Tremblay5,277
|
|
||
|Jean-Pierre Blackburn
|-
| style="background-color:whitesmoke" |Lac-Saint-Jean
||
|Lucien Bouchard27,209
|
|Bertrand Bouchard5,390
|
|Jean Paradis6,348
|
|
||
|Lucien Bouchard
|-
| style="background-color:whitesmoke" |Manicouagan
||
|Charles Langlois17,126
|
|Sylvain Garneau6,355
|
|Carol Guay4,008
|
|Alan John York (PfC)281
||
|Brian Mulroney
|-
| style="background-color:whitesmoke" |Montmorency—Orléans
||
|Charles Deblois30,578
|
|Robert Paquet11,578
|
|Éric Gourdeau7,700
|
|Jean Bédard (Ind)670
||
|Anne Blouin
|-
| style="background-color:whitesmoke" |Roberval
||
|Benoît Bouchard26,717
|
|Martin Cauvier4,219
|
|Réjean Lalancette3,318
|
|Mémile Michel Simard (Rhino) 723
||
|Benoît Bouchard
|}

1984 - 33rd General Election 

Canadian federal election results in Quebec